Acer × freemanii, Freeman maple or Freeman's maple, is a naturally occurring hybrid maple that is the result of a cross between Acer rubrum (red maple) and Acer saccharinum (silver maple). Wild specimens are found in eastern North America where the parent species overlap. The species is named for Oliver M. Freeman of the U.S. National Arboretum who hybridized A. rubrum with A. saccharinum in 1933. The fall foliage is a striking orange-red. It has many commercially available cultivars and is frequently used as a street tree.

Cultivars
The cultivars are typically deliberately hybridized and selected in nurseries, not drawn from the wild specimens. Usually infertile (a desirable trait in cultivated maples), they have stronger branch attachments than silver maples and faster growth rates than red maples.
'Armstrong', with a more yellow fall foliage
Autumn Fantasy
'Celzam', trade name 
Firefall
'Jeffersred', trade name , recipient of the RHS's Award of Garden Merit 
'Marmo', which does not produce seeds
'Morgan' trade name 
'Scarsen', trade name 
Sienna Glen

Description
Even high-powered morphometric analyses of leaf shape cannot easily distinguish Acer × freemanii individuals from the parent species. All that can be said is that Acer × freemanii is generally intermediate between the parents.

References

freemanii
Interspecific plant hybrids
Ornamental plant cultivars
Ornamental trees
Plants described in 1969